Hoohoo, Hoo Hoo or Hoo-Hoo may refer to:

 Alexandria Hoo Hoos, a baseball team in Alexandria, Louisiana
 Orange Hoo–Hoos, a baseball team in Orange, Texas
 Concatenated Order of Hoo-Hoo, a fraternal and service organization
 Hoo Hoo Monument, in Gurdon, Arkansas
 Hoohoo, West Virginia, an unincorporated community